Samir El-Youssef (born 1965) is a Palestinian-British writer and critic, who was born in Rashidieh, a Palestinian refugee camp in southern Lebanon, where he lived until he was ten, before moving to Sidon. El-Youssef's father is a Sunni and his mother is from the only Shia Palestinian family. He emigrated to Cyprus in 1989 and since 1990 has been living in London, where he studied philosophy and gained a Master of Arts degree from the University of London. In 2000, he was granted British citizenship.
 
He writes in both Arabic and English, and some of his work has been translated into German, Italian, Greek and Norwegian. In 2004, he co-authored a book with Israeli author Etgar Keret, called Gaza Blues: Different Stories. His latest book, The Illusion of Return, published in 2007, is his first novel written in English. He is also an essayist with a wide range of interests including literature, politics, philosophy and cultural studies. His essays and reviews have appeared in major Arabic periodicals and newspapers such as the London-based Al-Hayat, as well as on openDemocracy.net, The Guardian's Comment is Free and in the New Statesman.

In 2005, the Swedish branch of the organisation International PEN granted El-Youssef the Tucholsky award, named after Kurt Tucholsky and given each year to a writer or publisher who is either being persecuted or threatened, or living in exile.

Bibliography
Samir El-Youssef and Etgar Keret: (2004) Gaza Blues: Different Stories, London: David Paul, 
Samir El-Youssef (2007) The Illusion of Return, London: Halban, 
Samir El-Youssef (2008) A Treaty of Love, London: Halban,

References

External links
Articles in the New Statesman
Profile at Comment is Free
Profile at openDemocracy.net

1965 births
Living people
Alumni of the University of London
Palestinian novelists
Palestinian non-fiction writers
Palestinian literary critics